Cullen Town Hall is a municipal building in The Square, Cullen, Moray, Scotland. The structure, which is currently used as a heritage centre, is a Category B listed building.

History
The first municipal building in Cullen was a tolbooth in the old town area, close to the Burn of Cullen, which dated back at least to the 16th century. The centrepiece of this new town was to be the town square and, on the east side of the town square, MacWilliam envisaged there would be a combined town hall and coaching house. The new town hall and coaching house was designed by William Robertson in the neoclassical style, built in ashlar stone with a harled finish at a cost of £3,000 and was completed in summer 1823.

The design involved a symmetrical curved main frontage of three bays on the corner of The Square and Seafield Street. The curved section featured three segmental headed doorways on the ground floor and three sash windows set in round headed recesses on the first floor. At roof level, there was a parapet and a carved coat of arms of the Earl of Seafield in a panel above. Wings of five bays each were erected to the left and the right of the curved section to accommodate the town hall and the coaching house respectively. The wings featured wider outer bays which were slightly projected forward and were fenestrated by sash windows set in round headed recesses on the first floor. The central sections of the wings, each of three bays, featured segmental headed doorways flanked by segmental headed windows on the ground floor, and square headed sash windows with architraves and cornices on the first floor. A five-bay stable bloc, which extended along Seafield Street, was erected to the east of the main building. Internally, the principal rooms were a ballroom, a courtroom and three prisoner cells; the courtroom, which was located behind the curved section on the first floor, was later adapted for use as a council chamber. Meanwhile, the coaching house evolved to become the Seafield Arms Hotel.  

The author, George MacDonald, gave a lecture on the life of the poet, Robert Burns, in the town hall in 1873. A four-bay extension to the north to create a library facing The Square was built to a design by John Fowlie and was completed in 1900. Following a major fire in the town hall in 1942, extensive repairs were carried out to a design by George Legg and completed in 1953. The town hall was also used for concerts and performers there included the rock band, Status Quo, in November 1969. The building continued to serve as the meeting place of the burgh council for much of the 20th century, but ceased to be the local seat of government when the enlarged Banff and Buchan District Council was formed in 1975.

The Seafield Arms Hotel fell vacant in the early part of the 21st century and was acquired by a local developer, Milne Property Developments, in 2014: it was refurbished at a cost of £1.4 million and re-opened in May 2019. After Moray Council announced the proposed closure of the town hall, it was also acquired by Milne Property Developments, in January 2019. The developer subsequently instigated works to convert the first floor of the town hall into extra space for the Seafield Arms Hotel, and leased the ground floor to the Cullen, Deskford and Portknockie Heritage Group for a nominal rental. Additional works to convert the ground floor into a heritage centre were carried out at a cost of  £60,000 and the new heritage centre was officially opened by the Lord Lieutenant of Banffshire, Andrew Simpson, on 14 September 2022.

See also
 List of listed buildings in Cullen, Moray

References

Government buildings completed in 1823
City chambers and town halls in Scotland
Category B listed buildings in Moray